A list of notable dancers from Slovenia.

 Stanislava Brezovar
 Pino Mlakar (1907–2006)
 Meta Vidmar

References

 
Dancer
Lists of dancers